Ousmane Camara may refer to:
Ousmane Camara (judoka) (born 1963), Malian judoka
Ousmane N'Gom Camara (born 1975), Guinean football winger
Ousmane Camara (basketball) (born 1989), French basketball player
Ousmane Camara (footballer, born 1998), Guinean football winger
Ousmane Camara (footballer, born 2003), French football midfielder

See also
Ousoumane Camara (born 1996), French footballer